Zehra Özbey Torun (born September 7, 1982) is a Turkish female para-archer competing in the women's recurve bow standing event. A former wheelchair basketball player, she competed at the 2016 Summer Paralympics.

Results
https://olympics.com/tokyo-2020/paralympic-games/en/results/archery/athlete-profile-n1729547-ozbey-torun-zehra.htm

Paralympic Games

7	Individual Recurve - Open	2016	Rio de Janeiro, BRA

World Championships

2	Team Recurve - Open	2019	's-Hertogenbosch, NED

9	Individual Recurve - Open	2019	's-Hertogenbosch, NED

9	Individual Recurve - Open	2017	Beijing, CHN

European Championships

6	Individual Recurve - Open	2018	Plzen, CZE

Early life
Zehra Özbay Torun was born with disability on September 7, 1982.

She lives in Antalya, Turkey, where she moved to after her marriage. She has a baby and works in the state service.

Sporting career
Zehra Özbay Torun began her sports career with Wheelchair DanceSport. She than switched over to wheelchair basketball and played in the national team. She took a break in her active sports life as she learned her pregnancy after the marriage. Nine months after giving birth to a baby, she returned to sports. She switched over to wheelchair archery in order to have more free time for her  baby. After a brief training by Vedat Erbay in the Vedat Erbay SK, she was admitted to the Turkey women's national wheelchair archery team.

She competed at the 2016 European Qualifier held in Saint-Jean-de-Monts, France, and obtained a quota spot for 2016 Paralympics in Rio de Janeiro, Brazil.

References

Living people
1982 births
Sportspeople from Antalya
Turkish women's wheelchair basketball players
Turkish female archers
Paralympic archers of Turkey
Wheelchair category Paralympic competitors
Archers at the 2016 Summer Paralympics
20th-century Turkish sportswomen
21st-century Turkish sportswomen